Ian Jack Hilsum (born 29 December 1981 in Newport, Isle of Wight) is a former English cricketer. Hilsum was a right-handed batsman who bowled Leg break.

Hilsum made a single List-A appearance for the Hampshire Cricket Board in the 2000 NatWest Trophy against the Huntingdonshire.

In 2002 Hilsum made his first-class debut for Oxford University, where he played two matches against Northamptonshire and Gloucestershire.

Hilsum also played six Second Eleven Championship matches for the Hampshire Second XI between 1999 and 2003. He represented Hampshire 1st XI in one game against Loughborough University.

External links
Ian Hilsum at Cricinfo
Ian Hilsum at CricketArchive

1981 births
Living people
People from Newport, Isle of Wight
Sportspeople from the Isle of Wight
English cricketers
Hampshire Cricket Board cricketers
Oxford MCCU cricketers